Ahmed Nofal is a Jordanian former footballer.

External links 
 

Living people
Jordanian footballers
Jordan international footballers
Association football forwards
Sportspeople from Amman
1987 births